Miss Teen Earth is an annual international beauty pageant based in Ecuador

The contest is the first teen pageant that promotes programs in favor of the environment and visits to children with cancer.

The Miss Teen Earth contest is an event that promotes the main tourist destinations in Ecuador.

The current titleholder is Yarely Vázquez  of México who was crowned on October 19, 2022, in Guayaquil, Ecuador.

History
The pageant started in Ecuador in the year 2012 and was continued in the coming year as well.

The Miss Teen Earth contest was held in the Central American country of Panama from 2014 to 2016.

During these years the competition was supported by the Mayor of Panama, who gave an important recognition to the pageant, for promoting environmentally beneficial activities, which included a reforestation program at the Parque Municipal Summit, a zoo and tropical botanical garden, refuge of different exotic plants and animals considered endangered.

Competition
The competition consists of introduction round, national costume, swimsuit, question answer round and evening gown.

Winners

1Judging of the competition took place outside of the normal pageant environment due to the global restrictions on public events and international travel imposed by the Covid-19 pandemic. The winner was crowned in a live-streamed event.

Countries by number of title wins

List of runners-up

Major beauty pageants
Miss Teen Earth titleholder in the world's major beauty contests as Miss Universe.

See also
Miss Teen Ecuador
Rodrigo Moreira

References

External links
 Miss Teen Official Site

Beauty pageants in Ecuador
Ecuadorian awards
International beauty pageants
Beauty pageants for youth